Murder House is the final book in The Murder House Trilogy and the 24th book in The Hardy Boys Undercover Brothers series.  It was published on September 30, 2008.

References

External links
HardyBoysCasefiles.com

The Hardy Boys books
2008 American novels
2008 children's books
Novels set in Beverly Hills, California
Novels set in Los Angeles